Club Deportivo Universidad Católica is a Chilean professional association football club based in Santiago. Universidad Católica currently plays in the Chilean Primera División.

This list encompasses the major honours won by Universidad Católica and records set by the club and their players. The club's record appearance maker is Mario Lepe, who made 639 appearances from 1982 to 2000; the club's record goalscorer is forward Rodrigo Barrera, who scored 118 goals in all competitions from 1990 to 2002.

Honours

Domestic

League 

 Primera División

 Winners (16): 1949, 1954, 1961, 1966, 1984, 1987, 1997-A, 2002-A, 2005-C, 2010, 2016-C, 2016-A, 2018, 2019, 2020, 2021

 Segunda División

 Winners (2): 1956, 1975

Cups 

 Copa Chile

 Winners (4): 1983, 1991, 1995, 2011

 Copa República

 Winners (1): 1983

 Supercopa de Chile:

 Winners (4): 2016, 2019, 2020, 2021

Continental 

 Copa Libertadores

 Runners-up (1): 1993

 Copa Interamericana: 1

 Winners (1):  1993

International (Unofficial) 

 International Tournament of Pascua: 1

 Winners (1): 1950

Players

Appearances 
Competitive, professional matches only. Bold indicates player is still active at club level.

Others 
 Player with most trophies with Universidad Católica: 11 –  José Pedro Fuenzalida
 Most appearances in Universidad Católica: 639 –  Mario Lepe
 Most appearances in Copa Libertadores de América: 76 –  Mario Lepe
 Most appearances in Copa Sudamericana: 27 –  Cristopher Toselli

Goalscorers 
Competitive, professional matches only. Appearances, including substitutes, appear in parentheses.

 1Includes all South America club competitive competitions, Copa Libertadores and Copa Interamericana.
 2Includes Torneos de Invierno, Copa República, Mercosur, Liguillas y Copa Apertura.

Others 
 Most goals scored in Primera División: 105 –  Raimundo Infante
 Most goals scored in Segunda División: 13 –  Horacio Cisternas
 Most goals scored in Copa Chile: 35 –  Jorge Aravena
 Most goals scored in Supercopa de Chile: 2
 Fernando Zampedri
 Gonzalo Tapia
 Most goals scored in Copa Libertadores: 18 –  Alberto Acosta
 Most goals scored in Copa Sudamericana: 6 –  Jorge Quinteros
 Most goals in a match: Luka Tudor, 7 goals (against Deportes Antofagasta, First Division, 21 November 1993)
 Youngest hat-trick scorer: Jeisson Vargas, 18 years, 51 days (against San Marcos de Arica, First Division, 6 November 2015)
 1º Division top scorers 
 17 –  Víctor Mancilla (1943)
 21 –  Osvaldo "Arica" Hurtado (1987)
 33 –  Alberto Acosta (1994)
 15 –  David Bisconti (Apertura 1997)
 19 –  Milovan Mirošević (2010)
 11 –  Nicolás Castillo (Clausura 2016)
 13 –  Nicolás Castillo (Apertura 2016)
 20 –  Fernando Zampedri (2021)
 23 –  Fernando Zampedri (2022)
 International cups top scorers
 9 –  Juan Carlos Almada (Copa Libertadores 1993)
 11 –  Alberto Acosta (Copa Libertadores 1997)
 5 –  Jorge Quinteros (Copa Libertadores 2006)
 5 –  Michael Ríos (Copa Sudamericana 2012)
America's Ideal Team
  Patricio Toledo (1991)
  José Guillermo del Solar (1991)
  Gary Medel (2009)

Others records 
 Least beaten goalkeeper: 1352 –  José María Buljubasich

Team records

Matches

Record wins 
 Record Primera División win: 10–1 (v. Palestino, 1994)
 Record Copa Chile win: 10–0 (v. San Pedro de Atacama,  2010)
Record Supercopa de Chile win: 5–0 (v. Palestino, 2019)
 Record Copa Libertadores win: 6–0 (v. Mineros de Guayana, Venezuela, 1997 and v. Minervén S.C., Venezuela, 1997)
 Record Copa Mercosur win: 2–0  (v. Boca Juniors, 29 September 1998)
 Record Copa Sudamericana win: 5–0  (v. Alianza Atlético, 2005)

Record defeats 
  Record Primera División defeat: 2–9  (v. Audax Italiano, 1945)
Record Supercopa de Chile defeat: 1–4  (v. Colo Colo, 2017)
Record Copa Libertadores defeat: 2–7  (v. Emelec, 1945)
Record Copa Mercosur defeat: 1–5  (v. Gremio, 1 September 1998)
Record Copa Sudamericana defeat: 0–5  (v. Independiente del Valle, 2019)

Record consecutive results 
 Most games won in one league season: 27 (in 1999)
 Most games won in short tournaments: 18 (in Clausura 2005)

Goals 
 Most goals scored in one league season: 102 (in 1999)
 Most goals scored in short tournaments: 56 (in Apertura 2002)

Points 

 Most points in one league season:
 Two points for a win: 54 points (in 39 matches in the 1970 Primera División de Chile, First Division)
 Three points for a win: 74 points (in 34 matches in the 2010 Primera Division of Chile, First Division)
Most points in short tournaments:
 Three points for a win: 49 points (in 19 matches in the 2005 Torneo Clausura, First Division)
 Fewest points in a season:
 Two points for a win: 10 points (in 10 matches in the 1942 Primera División de Chile, First Division)
 Three points for a win: 44 points (in 30 matches in the 2000 Chilean Primera División, First Division)
Fewest points in short tournaments:
 Three points for a win: 16 points (in 15 matches in the 2017 Chilean Primera División, First Division)

Other achievements
 Seasons in Primera División: 79 (1939–1955, 1957–1973, 1976–)
 Seasons in Segunda División: 3 (1956, 1974–1975)
 Best IFFHS position: 8th
 Highest attendance: 77,890 against Universidad de Chile (on 11 January 1967, at Estadio Nacional)
Highest home attendance: 20,396 against Cobreloa (on 1 November 1992, at San Carlos de Apoquindo)

Managerial records

Season-by-season performance

South America statistics

References 

Statistics
Universidad Católica